Highway 962 is an isolated provincial highway in the far north part of the Canadian province of Saskatchewan. For part of the year the highway is not connected to any other highway in the province, but during the winter months a winter (ice) road forms across Lake Athabasca, connecting to Highway 962 and allowing access to Fond-du-Lac and other communities to the east. Highway 962 is about 40 km (25 mi) long.

Highway 962 starts where the Uranium City Winter Road ends at Lake Athabasca, about 456 km from the nearest major settlement, Fort McMurray, Alberta. It then passes through the communities of Uranium City and Eldorado before terminating at a dead end near Beaverlodge Lake.

Major intersections

See also 
Roads in Saskatchewan
Transportation in Saskatchewan

References 

962